Gufflet is a surname. Notable people with the surname include:

Maurice Gufflet (1863–1915), French sailor and Olympian, brother of Robert
Robert Gufflet (1883–1933), French sailor and Olympian, brother of Maurice

Surnames of French origin